This is a list of boat types. For sailing ships, see: List of sailing boat types.

A

 Airboat 
 Ark
 Auxiliary ship

Top of page

B

 Banana boat (merchant)
 Banana boat (recreational)
 Barge 
 Bass boat
 Boita
 Bow rider
 Bracera
 Brig
 Brigantine

Top of page

C

 Cabin cruiser 
 Cruise ship
 Cable ferry
 Canoe
 Cape Islander
 Captain's gig
 Car-boat
 Car float
 Catamaran
 Center console
 Chundan vallam
 Coble
 Cog
 Coracle
 Cornish pilot gig
 Crash rescue boat
 Cuddy boat
 Cutter
 Currach (sp. to West of Ireland and Scotland)

Top of page

D

 Deck Boat
 Dhow
 Dhoni
 Dinghy
 Dorna
 Dory
 Dragon boat
 Drift boat
 Drifter (fishing)
 Drifter (naval)
 Dugout
 Durham boat

Top of page

E

 Electric boat
 Express cruiser

Top of page

F

 Faering
 Felucca
 Ferry
 Fireboat
 Fishing boat (contemporary)
 Fishing boat (traditional)
 Float tube
 Fly
 Fishing tug
 Frigate

Top of page

G

 Galley
 Galleon
 Galway hooker
 Garbage scow
 Gig (boat)
 Go-fast boat
 Gondola
 Gundalow
 Great Lakes freighter

Top of page

H

 Higgins
 Houario
 Houseboat
 Hovercraft
 Hydrofoil
 Hydroplane

Top of page

I

 Ice boat
 Inflatable boat

Top of page

J

 Jetboat
 Jet ski
 Jon boat
 Jukung
 Junk

Top of page

K

 Kayak and Sea kayak
 Ketch
 Kettuvallam

Top of page

L

 Lafitte skiff
 Launch
 Landing craft
 Lifeboat
 Lighter
 Liner
 LNG carrier
 Log boat
 Langschiff
 Longboat
 Longship
 Longtail
 Lugger
 Luxury yacht

Top of page

M

 Mackinaw boat
 Masula boat
 Missile boat
 Monitor
 Motorboat
 Motor Launch (naval)
 Mini Gascogna

Top of page

N

 Narrowboat
 Naval ship
 Nordland
 Norfolk wherry

Top of page

O

 Oiler (ship)
 Optimist
 Origami boat
 Outrigger canoe

Top of page

P

 Padded V-hull
 Paddle steamer
 Patrol boat
 Pedalo (paddle boat)
 Personal water craft (PWC)
 Pinnace (ship's boat)
 Pink (ship)
 Pirogue
 Pleasure barge
 Pleasure craft
 Police watercraft
 Pontoon
 Powerboat
 Pram (boat)
 Pram (ship)
 Proa
 Pump boat
 Punt

Top of page

Q

Q-Ship

Top of page

R

 Raft
 Reaction ferry
 Recreational trawler
 Reed boat
 Replenishment oiler
 Rigid-hulled inflatable
 Riverboat
 Rodney boat
 Roll-on/roll-off ship
 Rowboat
 Runabout

Top of page

S

 Sailboat
 Sampan
 Schooner
 Scow
 Sea kayak and Kayak
 Shad boat
 Shallop
 Sharpie
 Shikara
 Ship's tender
 Ski boat
 Skiff
 Skipjack
 Small-craft sailing
 Slipper Launch
 Sloop
 Speed boat
 Special Operations Craft – Riverine (SOC-R)
 Steam boat
 Submarine
 Surf boat
 Surfboard
 Swift boat

Top of page

T

 Tanker 
 Tarai Bune
 Tartane
 Tjotter
 Torpedo boat
 Tour boat
 Towboat
 Trailer sailor
 Train ferry
 Trimaran
 Trawler (fishing)
 Trawler (naval)
 Trawler (recreational)
 Tugboat

Top of page

U

 U-boat
 Umiak

Top of page

V

 Very Slender Vessel
 Vlet

Top of page

W

 Waka
 Wakeboard boat
 Walkaround
 Water ambulance
 Water taxi
 Weidling
 Whaleboat
 Wherry

Top of page

X

 Xebec

Top of page Watercraft

Y

 Yacht
 Yawl
 Yoal

Top of page

Z

 Zille

Top of page

See also
Lists of watercraft types

Boat Types